Abbott's Get Together is a long-running convention for magicians in the United States and around the world, which is held each year in Colon, Michigan.  It was founded in 1937 by Percy Abbott and his business partner, Recil Bordner.  The Get Together is well-known within the magician industry as an annual event to gather and share information with their peers.  There are routinely multiple stage shows, a close-up magic gala, lectures, contests, and a dealer's room.  The 70th anniversary of the Get-Together took place on August 1–4, 2007.

History of the Get-Together

Abbott Magic Company 
Percy Abbott, an Australian-born magician who owned several Australian magic supply companies in the early 1900s, co-founded the Blackstone Magic Company in Colon, Michigan with Harry Blackstone Sr. in 1927.  Eighteen months later, the two parted ways.  In 1934 Abbott reopened the business as the "Abbott Magic Company" with a new partner, Recil Bordner, and in an attempt to boost poor sales, they decided to hold an open house.  Fifty magicians from the area of Michigan, Indiana, and Ohio came to watch as Bordner performed with other magicians while Abbott was the MC.  This event was closed to the public, but boosted sales so much that another open house was held the following year to even more success.  In 1937 it was officially opened to the public and moved to the high school gymnasium.

See also
 Magic convention

References

External links
 Official Magic Get Together website

Recurring events established in 1937
Magic conventions
Michigan culture
Conventions in Michigan
Tourist attractions in St. Joseph County, Michigan